is a railway station located in Nara, Japan. Operated by West Japan Railway Company (JR West), it is the main stop in the city of Nara on the Kansai Main Line (Yamatoji Line), the terminus for the Sakurai Line (Man-yō Mahoroba Line), and Nara Line trains for  begin here and run on the Kansai Line to  before diverging. Also, a limited number of Gakkentoshi Line trains terminate here via Kizu during early mornings and late nights.

Overview
It is the central station of JR in the city of Nara, with many trains departing for Kyoto and Tennoji.

Layout
This station has three elevated island platforms serving five tracks.

Platforms

Passenger statistics
According to the "Statistical Yearbook of Nara Prefecture", the average number of passengers per day is as follows.

Adjacent stations

|-
!colspan=5|JR West

|}

Bus terminals

highway buses 
 Yamato; For Shinjuku Station and Keio Plaza Hotel
 Yamato; For Hon-Atsugi Station, Yokohama Station, Keisei Ueno Station, Tokyo Skytree, Tokyo Disney Resort, Nishi-Funabashi Station, and Kaihimmakuhari Station
 Premium Dream / Seishun Eco Dream; For Shinjuku Station, Tokyo Station, and Shin-Kiba Station
 For Nagoya Station
 Airport Limousine; For Kansai International Airport
 Airport Limousine; For Osaka International Airport

Gallery

See also
Kintetsu Nara Station
 List of railway stations in Japan

References

External links

  

Railway stations in Nara Prefecture
Railway stations in Japan opened in 1890
Buildings and structures in Nara, Nara